Béla Anton Leoš Fleck (born July 10, 1958) is an American banjo player. An acclaimed virtuoso, he is an innovative and technically proficient pioneer and ambassador of the banjo, bringing the instrument from its bluegrass roots to jazz, classical, rock and various world music genres. He is best known for his work with the bands New Grass Revival and Béla Fleck and the Flecktones. Fleck has won 15 Grammy Awards and been nominated 33 times.

In 2020, he was inducted into the International Bluegrass Music Hall of Fame as a member of New Grass Revival.

Early life and career
A native of New York City, Fleck was named after Hungarian composer Béla Bartók, Austrian composer Anton Webern, and Czech composer Leoš Janáček. He was drawn to the banjo at a young age when he heard Earl Scruggs play the theme song for the television show Beverly Hillbillies and when he heard "Dueling Banjos" by Eric Weissberg and Steve Mandell on the radio. At the age of 15, he received his first banjo from his grandfather. During the train ride home, a man volunteered to tune the banjo and suggested he learn from the book How to Play the Five String Banjo by Pete Seeger. He attended the High School of Music & Art in New York City, playing French horn until he flunked and was transferred to the choir, though he spent most of his time on the banjo. He studied the book Bluegrass Banjo by Pete Wernick and took lessons from Erik Darling, Marc Horowitz, and Tony Trischka.

After graduating from high school, he moved to Boston and became a member of the group Tasty Licks, with whom he recorded two albums. He released his debut solo album, Crossing the Tracks (1979), and it was chosen Best Overall Album by the readers of Frets magazine.

Fleck played on the streets of Boston with bassist Mark Schatz. Along with guitarist Glen Lawson and mandolinist Jimmy Gaudreau, they formed Spectrum in 1981. That same year, Sam Bush asked Fleck to join New Grass Revival. Fleck performed with New Grass Revival for nine years. In 1984, he played on the album Snakes Alive! by the Dreadful Snakes (Rounder 0177), along with Jerry Douglas, Roland White and Blaine Sprouse. During this time, in 1987 Fleck recorded another solo album, Drive, which was nominated for a Grammy Award in 1988 for Best Bluegrass Album. During the 1980s Fleck and Bush also performed live with Doc Watson and Merle Watson in bluegrass festivals, most notably the annual Telluride Bluegrass Festival. Bela also played with Jerry Garcia at the Hearst Greek Theatre on  August 5, 1990.

Béla Fleck and the Flecktones

In 1988, Fleck and Victor Wooten formed Béla Fleck and the Flecktones with keyboardist and harmonica player Howard Levy and Wooten's brother, Roy "Future Man" Wooten, who played synthesizer-based percussion. They recorded numerous albums, most notably Flight of the Cosmic Hippo, their second album, which reached number one on the Billboard Top Contemporary Jazz Albums chart and found increased popularity among fans of jazz fusion.

Levy left the group in 1992, making the band a trio until saxophonist Jeff Coffin joined the group onstage in 1997. His first studio recording with the band was their 1998 album, Left of Cool. Coffin left the group in 2008 to replace the Dave Matthews Band's saxophonist, the late LeRoi Moore. Levy returned to the Flecktones in 2009. Béla Fleck and the original Flecktones recorded Rocket Science and toured in 2011.

Other music and recordings

Fleck played banjo on Before These Crowded Streets by the Dave Matthews Band, including the album's debut single "Don't Drink the Water".

In 1989 Fleck was invited to join the supergroup Strength in Numbers, headed by Sam Bush on mandolin, with Jerry Douglas on resonator guitar (dobro), Edgar Meyer on bass, and Mark O'Connor on violin. The group recorded just one album, The Telluride Sessions, before Bush disbanded the group.

In 2001, he collaborated with Edgar Meyer on Perpetual Motion, an album of classical music played on the banjo. They were accompanied by John Williams, Evelyn Glennie, Joshua Bell, and Gary Hoffman. Perpetual Motion won Grammy Awards for Best Arrangement and Best Classical Crossover Album.

Fleck and Meyer composed a double concerto for banjo and bass and performed its debut with the Nashville Symphony Orchestra. They were commissioned by the Orchestra to compose a trio concerto, for which they invited Indian tabla player Zakir Hussain. The concerto debuted in Nashville in 2006 when it was recorded for the album The Melody of Rhythm. Fleck premiered the Concerto for Banjo in Nashville, Tennessee on September 22, 2011, performing it with the full Nashville Symphony Orchestra.

In 2005, while the Flecktones were on hiatus, Fleck undertook several new projects: recording with traditional African musicians; co-writing the documentary Bring it Home about the Flecktones; co-producing Song of the Traveling Daughter, the debut album by his wife, Abigail Washburn; forming the acoustic fusion supergroup Trio! with Jean-Luc Ponty and Stanley Clarke; and recording an album as a member of the Sparrow Quartet with Washburn, Ben Sollee, and Casey Driessen.

Personal life
 Fleck is married to banjo player Abigail Washburn.  Washburn first met Fleck in Nashville at a square dance at which she was dancing and he was playing. Fleck produced Washburn's first solo album. Fleck brought Washburn to the wedding of his half-brother -- award-winning children's television writer Sascha Paladino -- in August 2007, and they played in a scratch band composed of wedding party members. In May 2009, the Bluegrass Intelligencer website satirized the upcoming "strategic marriage" of Washburn and Fleck, with Driessen joking that the couple promised a "male heir" who will be the "Holy Banjo Emperor."

Fleck and Washburn have two sons, Juno (born 2013) and Theo (born 2018).

Media appearances
He appeared on the cover of the July/August 2013 issue of Making Music magazine.

Festivals
Alone and with the Flecktones, Fleck has appeared at the High Sierra Music Festival, Telluride Bluegrass Festival, Merlefest, Montreal International Jazz Festival, Toronto Jazz Festival, Newport Folk Festival, Delfest, Austin City Limits Music Festival, Shakori Hills, Bonnaroo, New Orleans Jazz Fest, Hardly Strictly Bluegrass and Rochester International Jazz Festival.

Music documentary
In the film "Throw Down Your Heart" (2008), a film crew follows Béla Fleck on his travels to Africa where he collaborates with some of the best musicians and researches the African origins of the banjo.

In a New York Times article about the film, Stephen Holden writes: "At every stop on a journey that takes him from Uganda to Tanzania to Gambia and finally to Mali, Mr. Fleck plays and records with gifted local musicians. Early in the film, a Ugandan villager insists that the common perception of Africa as a continent ravaged by war and disease is 'just a very small bit of what Africa is,' and “Throw Down Your Heart” sets out to prove him right."

Discography

Accolades

Grammy Awards and nominations
Fleck has shared Grammy Awards with Asleep at the Wheel, Alison Brown, and Edgar Meyer. He has been nominated in more categories than any other musician, namely country, pop, jazz, bluegrass, classical, folk, spoken word, composition, and arranging.

References

Further reading
 Gray, Michael (1998). "Béla Fleck". In The Encyclopedia of Country Music. Paul Kingsbury, Editor. New York: Oxford University Press. pp. 174–5.

External links

 BelaFleck.com – Béla Fleck Official website
 Flecktones.com –  Flecktones Official Website
   BACH & friends Documentary 

 
1958 births
American bluegrass musicians
American street performers
American country banjoists
American male singers
American male songwriters
Béla Fleck and the Flecktones members
Grammy Award winners
Jazz banjoists
Jewish American musicians
Jewish songwriters
Latin Grammy Award winners
Living people
Singers from New York City
Musicians from Brooklyn
Musicians from Nashville, Tennessee
New Grass Revival members
World music singers
American folk rock musicians
American jazz musicians
American banjoists
Rock banjoists
The High School of Music & Art alumni
Rhino Records artists
Rounder Records artists
Sony Classical Records artists
Warner Records artists
Jazz musicians from New York (state)
American male jazz musicians
Sparrow Quartet members
American world music musicians
Lyle Lovett and His Large Band members